Jiaomiao is a town in Qihe County, Dezhou, in northwestern Shandong province, China.

References 

Township-level divisions of Shandong